Jesús Montesdeoca (born 30 October 1966) is a Spanish wrestler. He competed in the men's freestyle 130 kg at the 1988 Summer Olympics.

References

External links
 

1966 births
Living people
Spanish male sport wrestlers
Olympic wrestlers of Spain
Wrestlers at the 1988 Summer Olympics
Place of birth missing (living people)
20th-century Spanish people
21st-century Spanish people